The Languages of Poland include Polish – the language of the indigenous population – and those of immigrants and their descendants. Polish is the only official language recognized by the country's constitution and the majority of the country's population speak it as a native language or use it for home communication. Deaf communities in Poland use Polish Sign Language, which belongs to the German family of Sign Languages.

Languages other than Polish that have existed in the region for at least 100 years can gain recognition as a regional or minority language, which have appropriate rules of use. In areas where the speakers of these languages make up more than 20% of the population, the language can receive the status of auxiliary language, while Polish remains the official language.

According to the Act of 6 January 2005 on national and ethnic minorities and on the regional languages, 16 languages have been recognized as minority languages; 1 regional language, 10 languages belonging to 9 national minorities (minorities from another sovereign state) and 5 languages belonging to 4 ethnic minorities (minorities that do not belong to another sovereign state). Jewish and Romani minorities each have 2 recognized minority languages.

Household languages
Language used in households by population as of 2011.

 Polish (37,815,606)
 Silesian (529,377)
 Kashubian (108,140)
 English (103,541)
 German (96,461)
 Belarusian (26,448)
 Ukrainian (24,539)
 Russian (19,805)
 Romany (14,468)
 French (10,677)
 Italian (10,295)
 Rusyn (6,279)
 Spanish (5,770)
 Lithuanian (5,303)
 Vietnamese (3,360)
 Other languages (31,800)
 Unspecified (519,698)
 Total (38,511,824)

National minority's languages 

Armenian
Belarusian
Czech
German
Yiddish 
Hebrew
Lithuanian
Russian
Slovak
Ukrainian

Ethnic minority's languages 
Karaim
Rusyn, called Lemko in Poland (Polish: "Łemkowski", see Lemko)
Two Romani languages are officially recognised: Polska Roma and Bergitka Roma.
Tatar, called Tartar by the act.

Official recognition gives the representatives of the minority under certain conditions the right to education in their language, having their language established as a secondary administrative language or help language in their municipality, financial support in the promotion of their language and culture, etc.

Regional languages 
Kashubian

Auxiliary languages

The bilingual status of gminas (municipalities) in Poland is regulated by the Act of 6 January 2005 on National and Ethnic Minorities and on the Regional Languages, which permits certain gminas with significant linguistic minorities to introduce a second, auxiliary language to be used in official contexts alongside Polish. The following is a list of languages by the number of gminas that have them as auxiliary languages.

Kashubian (5)
Lithuanian (1)
German (33)
Belarusian (5)

Languages of bilingual settlements

A settlement can use any officially recognised, regional, or minority languages in their name. Currently only 5 settlements have exercised this power. The following is a list of languages by their use in settlements dual language names.

Belarusian (27)
German (359)
Kashubian (827)
Lithuanian (30)
Rusyn (9)

Languages of diasporas and immigrants 
These languages are not recognised as minority languages, as the Act of 2005 defines minority as "a group of Polish citizens (...) striving to preserve its language, culture or tradition, (...) whose ancestors have been living on the present territory of the Republic of Poland for at least 100 years":

Greek: the language of the Greek diaspora in Poland of 1950s.
Vietnamese: the language of the biggest immigrant community in Poland since the 1960s, having their own newspapers, schools, churches etc.

Sign languages
The Polish Sign Language is the language of the deaf community in Poland. It descends from German Sign Language. Its lexicon and grammar are distinct from the Polish language, although there is a manually coded version of Polish known as System Językowo-Migowy (SJM, or Signed Polish), which is often used by interpreters on television and by teachers in schools. In 2012, under the "Sign Language Act", the language received official status and can be chosen as the language of instruction by those who require it.

Unrecognised regional languages 
It is disputed whether Silesian is either one of the four major dialects of Polish or a separate language, distinct from Polish. Ethnologue distinguishes the Silesian language from the Upper Silesian dialect of Polish language. There are efforts by some Silesian groups advocating for legal recognition to be granted (similar to that of Kashubian) and the topic is considered a political issue.
Wymysorys is an endangered language with very few speakers. It is native to Wilamowice, but, unlike the similarly endangered Karaim language, it was practically unknown during the preparation of the aforementioned Act.

Dead and artificial languages 
Among languages used in Poland, Ethnologue mentions one constructed language – the International Auxiliary Language Esperanto (created in Poland), and one dead language – Prussian, but does not mention two other known defunct languages: Slovincian, which consists of dialects of Pomeranian, died out in the beginning of the 20th century, and is closely related to Kashubian, and Yatvingian, which died around the mid-16th (or possibly end of 19th) century. As the result of the Nazi's atrocities and the ensuing border shift at Germany's expense and ethnic cleansing, various dialects of German historically prevalent in Poland's western and northwestern regions have become endangered, such as Lower Silesian and Low German.

Foreign languages 
Eurobarometer studies in 2012 showed that 33%, 19%, and 18% of Poles declared to be able to have a conversation in English, German, and Russian, respectively. As of 2015, around 32% of Polish citizens declared knowledge of the English language according to the Centre for Public Opinion Research. However, other surveys show that over 50% of Poles can speak English. Another study shows that 89% of Polish students are learning and/or can speak English.

See also 
 Dialects of Polish

References

External links
jezyki-mniejszosci.pl - website of the Polish government regarding minority languages
all the acts, dispositions and bylaws related to the issue of minorities and their languages
Polish text of the Act of 6 January 2005 on national and ethnic minorities and on the regional languages from ISAP 
Policy on Minority and Regional Languages in Poland

 
Polish culture
Polish language